Frances Ann O'Connor (born 12 June 1967) is a British–born Australian actress and director. She is best known for her roles in the films Mansfield Park, Bedazzled, A.I. Artificial Intelligence, The Importance of Being Earnest, and Timeline. O'Connor has won an AACTA Award for her performance in Blessed, and also earned two Golden Globe Award nominations for her performances in Madame Bovary and The Missing. In 2022, her debut feature as writer and director, Emily was released.

Early life
O'Connor was born in Wantage, at the time part of Berkshire, England, to a pianist mother and nuclear physicist father; her family moved to Perth, Australia, when she was two years old. She is the middle of five children, with one older brother, one older sister, and two younger sisters. O'Connor was raised Roman Catholic, and attended the Mercedes College in Perth. She then went on to attend the Western Australian Academy of Performing Arts and earned a Bachelor of Arts degree in literature from Curtin University in Western Australia.

Career
O'Connor made her film debut in Emma-Kate Croghan's critically acclaimed independent romantic comedy Love and Other Catastrophes (1996). She received her first AACTA Award for Best Actress in a Leading Role nomination for her performance in the film. In 1997, she had the leading role in Kiss or Kill, and starred opposite Cate Blanchett and Richard Roxburgh in Thank God He Met Lizzie. In 1999, O'Connor starred as Fanny Price in the British romantic comedy-drama Mansfield Park. The film also received favourable reviews from critics. The following year, O'Connor earned a Golden Globe Award nomination for her performance as Emma Bovary in the film Madame Bovary.

In 2000, O'Connor began her career in Hollywood with a role in the comedy film Bedazzled, a remake of the 1967 film of the same name. She starred opposite Brendan Fraser and Elizabeth Hurley. The following year, she had a leading role in the Steven Spielberg science fiction drama A.I. Artificial Intelligence. She was nominated for a Saturn Award for Best Actress for her performance in the film. In 2002, she starred alongside Rupert Everett, Colin Firth, and Judi Dench in the romantic comedy-drama The Importance of Being Earnest, directed by Oliver Parker and based on Oscar Wilde's classic play. In 2003, O'Connor starred opposite Paul Walker in the science fiction film Timeline, which bombed at the box office.

In 2004, O'Connor returned to independent films and starred in Iron Jawed Angels with Hilary Swank, Julia Ormond, and Anjelica Huston. She received two more AACTA Award for Best Actress nominations for Three Dollars (2005) and The Hunter. In 2008, she starred in the short-lived ABC comedy-drama series Cashmere Mafia opposite Lucy Liu, Miranda Otto, and Bonnie Somerville. In 2009, she won an AACTA Award for Best Actress for her performance in Blessed. She later appeared in Jayne Mansfield's Car, Little Red Wagon, and The Truth About Emanuel. In 2011, O'Connor was cast in the ABC drama pilot Hallelujah, created by Marc Cherry, but the show was not picked up to series. From 2013 to 2014, she starred as Rose Selfridge in the British period drama Mr Selfridge.

In 2014, O'Connor was cast as lead in the British drama The Missing. She was nominated for the Golden Globe Award for Best Actress – Miniseries or Television Film for her performance in the series. She then appeared as Belle's mother Colette in the fourth season of the American series Once Upon a Time. In 2016, O'Connor co-starred in the horror film The Conjuring 2, alongside Vera Farmiga and Patrick Wilson, and in Cleverman, opposite Iain Glen.

Personal life
O'Connor and her long-term partner, Gerald Lepkowski, had a son, Luka, in May 2005. The couple married in 2011 at O'Connor's mother's residence in Australia.

Filmography

Film

Television

Awards and nominations

References

External links
 

1967 births
Living people
Actresses from Oxfordshire
Australian expatriate actresses in the United States
Australian film actresses
Australian people of Irish descent
Australian Shakespearean actresses
Australian television actresses
Best Actress AACTA Award winners
Curtin University alumni
Edith Cowan University alumni
English emigrants to Australia
People from Wantage
Western Australian Academy of Performing Arts alumni
20th-century Australian actresses
21st-century Australian actresses